Christian Howes (born February 21, 1972) is an American violinist, teacher, and composer. He is an associate professor at the Berklee College of Music. He has worked with Les Paul and Greg Osby. In 2011 the DownBeat magazine Critics' Poll ranked him the No. 1 Rising Star in violin.

Discography
 Confluence (Christian Howes, 1997)
 Ten Yard (Christian Howes, 1999)
 Jazz on Sale (Khaeon World Music, 2003)
 Heartfelt (Resonance, 2008)
 Out of the Blue (Resonance, 2010)
 Southern Exposure (Resonance, 2012)
 American Spirit (Resonance, 2015)

References

External links

1972 births
Living people
American jazz violinists
American male violinists
American jazz composers
Record producers from Ohio
Berklee College of Music faculty
People from Rocky River, Ohio
Jazz musicians from Ohio
21st-century American violinists
American male jazz composers
21st-century American male musicians
Resonance Records artists